Maurice Pomarède (22 December 1910 – 26 December 1962) was a French racing cyclist. He rode in the 1935 Tour de France.

References

1910 births
1962 deaths
French male cyclists
Place of birth missing